"Instagram" is a song by Belgian production duo Dimitri Vegas & Like Mike, French DJ David Guetta, Puerto Rican rapper Daddy Yankee, Dutch DJ duo Afro Bros, and Dominican singer Natti Natasha. It was released as a single on 5 July 2019 by Smash the House. The song is about the popular social media app Instagram. The song was written by David Guetta, Francesca Richard, Dimitri Thivaios, Michael Thivaios, Ramon Luis Ayala Rodriguez, Giordano M.S. Ashruf, Natalia Alexandra Gutierrez Batista, Rashid M.S. M Badloe and Sharef M.R. Badloe.

Background
On 18 June 2019, Natti Natasha and Daddy Yankee announced the song on their social media by posting photos from the video set in Ibiza, Spain. Natasha also posted a video thanking the artists, calling it an "amazing moment".

Music video
A music video to accompany the release of "Instagram" was first released onto YouTube on 5 July 2019 at a total length of three minutes and thirty-six seconds.

Charts

Weekly charts

Year-end charts

Certifications

References

2019 songs
2019 singles
David Guetta songs
Daddy Yankee songs
Natti Natasha songs
Macaronic songs
Music videos shot in Ibiza
song
Songs written by David Guetta
Songs written by Daddy Yankee
Song recordings produced by David Guetta